The 1933 Lafayette Leopards football team was an American football team that represented Lafayette College in the Middle Three Conference during the 1933 college football season. In its 10th season under head coach Herb McCracken, the team compiled a 3–5–1 record. Jerry Miller was the team captain.

Schedule

References

Lafayette
Lafayette Leopards football seasons
Lafayette Leopards football